Schoff is a Standard German surname, derived from the Low German Schoof. The word Schof is a specifically northern German word for a sheaf. The equivalent in southern, High German dialects is Schaub.

Notable people with the surname include:

Rick Schoff, Australian rules footballer
Stephen Alonzo Schoff, 19th-century American engraver
Victor E. Schoff (born 1955), American conspiracy theorist
Wilfred Harvey Schoff (1874–1932), American antiquarian and classical scholar

German-language surnames